Worringer is a surname. Notable people with this name include:

 Emmy Worringer (1878–1961), German artist; sister of Wilhelm
 Marta Worringer (1881–1965), German Expressionist artist; wife of Wilhelm
 Wilhelm Worringer (1881–1965), German art historian; brother of Emmy, husband of Marta

See also
 Worringer Bruch, a place in Germany